Asier Barahona Bregón (born 18 November 1992) is a Spanish footballer who plays for UD Socuéllamos as a forward.

Club career
Born in Miranda de Ebro, Province of Burgos, Barahona played youth football with local CD Mirandés. In July 2010 he was loaned to lowly CD Aurrerá de Vitoria, making his senior debut with the latter club in the Tercera División.

Barahona returned to Mirandés the following season, totalling 686 minutes in the Segunda División B as the Castile and León side promoted to Segunda División for the first time ever. He signed a new contract on 14 July 2012, being immediately loaned to Deportivo Alavés of the same league and again achieving promotion, to which he contributed 21 appearances including the playoffs.

On 12 October 2013, Barahona made his professional debut, playing the last 12 minutes in a 2–3 home loss against his previous team Alavés. He scored his first goal in the second tier on 3 January 2015, the last in the 3–1 away win over the same opponents.

Released by Mirandés in June 2015, Barahona resumed his career in the lower leagues.

References

External links

1992 births
Living people
Spanish footballers
Footballers from Castile and León
Association football forwards
Segunda División players
Segunda División B players
Tercera División players
Segunda Federación players
CD Mirandés footballers
CD Aurrerá de Vitoria footballers
Deportivo Alavés players
Getafe CF B players
Extremadura UD footballers
Zamudio SD players
Arandina CF players
Burgos CF Promesas players
UD Socuéllamos players